Alloclita mongolica is a moth in the family Cosmopterigidae. It was described by Sinev in 1993. It is found in Mongolia.

References

Natural History Museum Lepidoptera generic names catalog

Antequerinae
Moths described in 1993
Moths of Asia